Agustín Cardozo may refer to:

 Agustín Cardozo (footballer, born 1997), Argentine midfielder
 Agustín Cardozo (footballer, born 1998), Argentine forward